Mustaffa bin Mohammad  was a Malaysian politician and former Minister of Social Welfare from 1987 to 1990. He also served as Deputy Minister of Works.

Election results

Honours

Honours of Malaysia
  :
  Officer of the Order of the Defender of the Realm (KMN) (1977)
  :
  Star of Sultan Ismail (BSI)
  Sultan Ibrahim Medal (PIS)
 Knight Commander of the Order of the Crown of Johor (DPMJ) – Dato' (1989)

References

2021 deaths
People from Johor
Malaysian people of Malay descent
Malaysian Muslims
United Malays National Organisation politicians
Government ministers of Malaysia
Members of the Dewan Rakyat
Knights Commander of the Order of the Crown of Johor
Officers of the Order of the Defender of the Realm